The Boston Society of Film Critics Award for Best Screenplay is one of the annual film awards given by the Boston Society of Film Critics.

Winners

1980s
 1980: Melvin and Howard
written by Bo Goldman
 1981: My Dinner with Andre
written by Andre Gregory and Wallace Shawn
 1982: Diner
written by Barry Levinson
 1983: Pauline à la plage (Pauline at the Beach)
written by Éric Rohmer
 1984: Repo Man
written by Alex Cox
 1985: The Purple Rose of Cairo
written by Woody Allen
 1986: Hannah and Her Sisters
written by Woody Allen
 1987: Broadcast News
written by James L. Brooks
 1988: Bull Durham
written by Ron Shelton
 1989: Crimes and Misdemeanors
written by Woody Allen

1990s
 1990: Reversal of Fortune
written by Nicholas Kazan
 1991: Naked Lunch
written by David Cronenberg
 1992: The Crying Game
written by Neil Jordan
 1993: Short Cuts
written by Robert Altman and Frank Barhydt
 1994: Pulp Fiction
written by Roger Avary and Quentin Tarantino
 1995: Sense and Sensibility
written by Emma Thompson
 1996: Big Night
written by Joseph Tropiano and Stanley Tucci
 1997: L.A. Confidential
written by Curtis Hanson and Brian Helgeland
 1998: Out of Sight
written by Scott Frank
 1999: Being John Malkovich
written by Charlie Kaufman

2000s

2010s

2020s

References

Boston Society of Film Critics Awards
Screenwriting awards for film